Xtra is a 2004 Indian Telugu-language adult romantic film directed by Veeru K and starring Ruthika and Santosh Pawan with Vadde Naveen in a supporting role.

Cast 
Ruthika as Nisha
Santosh Pawan as Nani
Vadde Naveen as Prem
Kondavalasa Lakshmana Rao as Drunkard
Jayalalita as Principal

Soundtrack 
The songs are composed by Bapu-Ramana. The film features three remixed songs: "Vangamaku", "Le Le Le Naaraja" and "Masaka Masaka".

Reception 
A critic from The Hindu wrote that "But what this film tells is that a girl who walks out from a person's life should patch up with him and a young man, who loves a girl older in age, should retract his steps". A critic from Idlebrain.com wrote that "This is an out-and-out adult film which is strictly recommended for desperate men who want to have fun". A critic from IANS wrote that "His [Veeru K's] latest Telugu presentation "Xtra is a substandard offering". A critic from Full Hyderabad wrote that "Though sounding like a B-grade flick, this one is not for those cheap lechers, skin-show lovers or deperate guys". A critic from Indiaglitz wrote that "Director Veeru is under illusions. He knows what he has got into and goes the whole hog with it. The sad part is he may have the last laugh".

Box office 
The film opened to houseful theatres. After the film's positive reception, Veeru K announed a similar film titled Thrill (2006) also starring Ruthika.

References